Martin Vinzenz Baldur Paul Maria (Martin) van Hees (born 26 July 1964 in Beilen) is a Dutch philosopher.

Van Hees was professor of ethics at the University of Groningen and since April 2013 professor of political theory at the University of Amsterdam. He received a VICI-grant from the Netherlands Organisation for Scientific Research (NWO) to further research and develop the program Modelling Freedom: Formal Analysis and Normative Philosophy. Van Hees is a vegetarian.

In August 2014, van Hees became professor of Ethics at VU University Amsterdam. He is also a senior editor of the journal Economics and Philosophy. In 2016, van Hees became Dean of the John Stuart Mill College of the VU Amsterdam and programme director for the VU's recently established Philosophy, Politics & Economics Bachelor's programme. Since 1 March 2021, van Hees became Dean of Amsterdam University College.

Education 
After receiving degrees in political science and philosophy at the Erasmus University in Rotterdam, van Hees obtained his PhD in social sciences at the Radboud University Nijmegen in 1994 with the dissertation: Rights, liberalism and social choice: a logical and game-theoretical analysis of individual and collective rights.

Van Hees became a member of the Royal Netherlands Academy of Arts and Sciences in 2013.

Bibliography

Books

Chapters in books

Journal articles 
 
 
 
 Response article by Ian Carter and Matthew H. Kramer

References

External links 
 Curriculum vitae of Martin van Hees

1964 births
Living people
20th-century Dutch philosophers
21st-century Dutch philosophers
Dutch writers
Academic staff of the University of Amsterdam
Academic staff of the University of Groningen
Radboud University Nijmegen alumni
Erasmus University Rotterdam alumni
People from Midden-Drenthe
Members of the Royal Netherlands Academy of Arts and Sciences